The FV 214 Conqueror, also known as Tank, Heavy No. 1, 120 mm Gun, Conqueror was a British heavy tank of the post-World War II era. It was developed as a response to the Soviet IS-3 heavy tank. The Conqueror's main armament, an L1 120 mm gun, was larger than the 20-pounder (83.4 mm) gun carried by its peer, the Centurion. The Conqueror's role was to provide long range anti-tank support for the Centurion. Nine Conquerors were issued for each regiment in Germany, usually grouped in three tank troops. In the British Army both the Conqueror and the Centurion were replaced by the Chieftain.

Design and development
The chassis was from the A 45 Infantry Support Tank, a project started in 1944 shortly after that of the A 41 Centurion. After the war, the project was relocated to that of the "Universal Tank" design of the FV 200 series. The 200 series was to have used a common hull for all uses (self-propelled artillery, armoured personnel carrier, three varieties of tank, etc.). One tank type was to be the heavy FV 201 of 55 tonnes, armed with an 83.8 mm gun.

In 1949, it was decided to bring the armament up to 120 mm. As this delayed the project, in 1952 the FV 201 hull was combined with a 17 pounder-armed Centurion Mk 2 turret to give the FV 221 Caernarvon Mark I. Twenty-one were built with the Mk III 20 pounder turret as the Caernarvon Mk II. The FV 221 may originally have been intended to be the "Main Battle Tank" member of the FV 201 series but with the success of the A 41 Centurion such a vehicle was no longer required. In either event, the Caernarvon was only used for chassis development work serving in troop trials. In 1955, the first Conqueror was produced. Twenty Mark 1 and 165 Mark 2 Conquerors were built, including conversions of Caernarvon Mk IIs. Production continued until 1959. It lost much tactical relevance once the Centurion was upgraded to an L7 105 mm gun.

The new, larger-calibre gun design was American, the same as used on the US M103 heavy tank; with separate charge and projectile, as would also be the case in the Chieftain that followed. The charge was not bagged but in a brass cartridge, which offered some safety advantages, but reduced shell capacity to 35.

The armour was very heavy for the time, especially in the front, where it was seven inches (178 mm) in the horizontal plane. Unfortunately, this, along with the weight of the huge turret required to house the large gun and the very large hull volume, made the vehicle very heavy, giving it a relatively low top speed and making it unreliable. Also, few bridges could support its weight. However, rather like the Second World War Churchill tank, the Conqueror had exceptional terrain handling characteristics.

One feature of particular note was the rotating commander's cupola, which was at the heart of the Conqueror's fire control system and was advanced for its time. The commander could align the cupola on a target independently of the turret, measure the range with a coincidence rangefinder, and then direct the gunner on to the new lay mechanically indicated to him by the cupola. In theory, when the gunner traversed to the new lay, he would find the target already under his sights, ready to be engaged. Meanwhile, the commander was free to search for the next target. The Soviet bloc also used similar devices, such as the TPKU-2 and TKN-3, on all of their post–World War II tanks, though theirs did not include a rangefinder.

Variants

The variants of the Conqueror tank and developments directly related to its development are:
FV 214 Conqueror
Mk I (had three periscopes for the driver)
Mk II (included better join of frontal armour plates, a single periscope for the driver, and an improved exhaust system)
Mk II/I/H – rebuilt Caernarvons.
Tank, Heavy No. 2, 183 mm Gun, FV 215
Design study of Conqueror chassis with limited traverse turret mounting 183 mm gun. Wooden mockup produced.
FV 221 Caernarvon
Mk I – prototype
Mk II – experimental series, 21 built
FV 222 Conqueror Armoured Recovery Vehicle (ARV)
Mk I – 8 produced
Mk II – 20 produced. Weight: 57 tons. Winch capacity: 45 tons (direct pull).

Operators
: 1955–1966. Deployed with BAOR in West Germany only.

Surviving vehicles

In the United Kingdom, Conqueror tanks are displayed at The Tank Museum, Bovington, at the Land Warfare Hall of the Imperial War Museum Duxford and at the Defence Capability Centre in Shrivenham. Other tanks are in the collections of the Musée des Blindés in France, the Gunfire Museum in Brasschaat (a Mark 2) and the Kubinka Tank Museum, Russia. One is privately owned in the United States as part of the Littlefield Collection and another is in use as a gate guardian outside the Royal Tank Regiment Officers' Mess, which was restored by 2nd Royal Tank Regiment Light Aid Detachment (REME) in 2009, having previously been in a deteriorating state at Castlemartin Ranges (where it had previously been the guardian "Romulus" before being replaced by a German Leopard MBT).

There are also two MkII ARVs at the Military History Museum on the Isle of Wight in an unrestored condition. A MkII ARV is held by the REME Museum of Technology, although it is not on display. There was formerly a Conqueror gate guardian at Base Vehicle Depot Ludgershall – informally known as "William". It is now part of the Isle of Wight Military Museum.

A Conqueror ARV remained in service at the Amphibious Experimental Establishment AXE, at Instow in North Devon, UK. It was used for beach tank recovery practice.
At least one Conqueror exists in poor condition on the grounds of Kirkcudbright Training Area in Scotland, where it was used as a gunnery target.
A number of Conquerors remain on the Haltern Training area in Germany.

References
Notes

Bibliography

External links

Photo gallery at svsm.org 
REME Museum of Technology: Conqueror Armoured Recovery Vehicle Mark 2

Heavy tanks of the United Kingdom
Cold War tanks of the United Kingdom
Heavy tanks of the Cold War
Vickers
Military vehicles introduced in the 1950s